The 2010 National Club Baseball Association (NCBA) Division II World Series was held at Point Stadium in Johnstown, PA from May 21 to May 25.  The third tournament's champion was Northeastern University.

Format
The format is similar to the NCAA College World Series in that eight teams participate in two four-team double elimination brackets with a couple differences. One being that in the NCBA, there is only one game that decides the national championship rather than a best-of-3 like the NCAA. Another difference which is between NCBA Division I and II is that Division II games are 7 innings while Division I games are 9 innings.

Participants
Macon State
Northeastern
Penn State†
Pulaski Tech
Rice
Southern Illinois
Western State (Colorado)
William & Mary
†-denotes school also fields an NCBA Division I team

Results

Bracket

Game Results

Championship Game

See also
2010 NCBA Division I World Series

Notes
Northeastern became the second and last school to win the NCBA Division II World Series in their first World Series appearance.  The only other school to accomplish this feat was Kentucky when they won the inaugural event in 2008.

References

Baseball in Pennsylvania
2010 in baseball
National Club Baseball Association
NCBA Division II